Emanuel "Manny" Perez (born February 19, 1999) is an American professional soccer player who plays as a midfielder for USL Championship club Louisville City.

College career 
Perez played two years of college soccer at North Carolina State University between 2017 and 2018, making a total of 29 appearances for NCSU, scoring 6 goals and tallying 9 assists.

Professional career

Celtic
On January 31, 2019, Perez joined Scottish Premiership side Celtic. Perez was immediately loaned out to USL Championship side North Carolina FC. He was again loaned to North Carolina FC ahead of the 2020 USL Championship season. Perez left the club after two seasons without playing a game.

Loan to North Carolina FC 
After joining the club on loan, Perez made his first team debut for North Carolina in a 4–1 win against defending champions Louisville City. He went on to make 23 appearances for the club that he represented during his youth. Of those games he started 12 times. He returned to NCFC for a second season on loan during the 2020 season. This was a season that was marred by the COVID-19 pandemic and shortened from the standard amount of games; however, Perez went on to make a further 14 appearances for his boyhood club before returning to Celtic.

Austin FC 
On April 26, 2021 it was announced that Perez had signed a contract with the Portland Timbers and was immediately loaned to Austin FC. Austin has the option to trade for Perez for $100,000 GAM at the end of the season. Following the 2021 season, Perez's contract option was declined by Austin and he returned to Portland.

Following the 2021 season, Perez returned to Portland, but they opted to decline their contract option on him and he left club.

On February 15, 2022, Perez signed with USL Championship side Louisville City.

Personal life
Perez was born in the United States, and is of Mexican descent.

Career statistics

Honors
United States U20
CONCACAF U-20 Championship: 2018

References

1999 births
Living people
American expatriate soccer players
American soccer players
American sportspeople of Mexican descent
Association football midfielders
Austin FC players
Celtic F.C. players
Louisville City FC players
NC State Wolfpack men's soccer players
North Carolina FC players
People from Garner, North Carolina
Portland Timbers players
Soccer players from North Carolina
USL Championship players
United States men's under-20 international soccer players